Senator Utter may refer to:

Dennis Utter (1939–2011), Nebraska State Senate
George H. Utter (1854–1912), Rhode Island State Senate